Macracaena is a genus of moth in the family Gelechiidae. It contains the species Macracaena adela, which is found in Australia.

References

Pexicopiini